Anoeta is the name of two distinct railway stations in Gipuzkoa, Spain.

Anoeta station (Euskotren), in San Sebastián
, in Anoeta